Gluema ivorensis is a species of plant in the family Sapotaceae. It is found in Cameroon, Ivory Coast, Gabon, and Ghana. It is threatened by habitat loss.

References

ivorensis
Vulnerable plants
Taxonomy articles created by Polbot
Taxa named by François Pellegrin
Taxa named by André Aubréville